Harny de Guerville was an 18th-century French playwright.

Apart from his own works, Harny contributed to two plays by Justine Favart (Les amours de Bastien et Bastienne, parodie du Devin de village (1753), and Les ensorcelés, ou Jeannot et Jeannette, parodie des Surprises de l’amour (1757)), and retouched one by Lesage.

Works 
 Candidamentor, ou le voyageur grec, Paris, 1766, in-12.
 Georget et Georgette, opéra comique in one act and in prose, mingled with ariettes, Paris, Duchesne, 1761, in-8°.
 Le petit-maître en province, comedy in one act and in free verse with ariettes. Paris, Vve Duchesne, 1765; another edition, Paris, N. B. Duchesne, 1772, in-8°.
 Le prix des talents, one-act parody of the third act of Fêtes de l’hymen et de l’amour by Jean-Philippe Rameau, all in vaudevilles, with M. S***, Paris, Duchesne, 1755, in-8°. (with Sabine)
 La sybille, one-act parody, all in ariettes and vaudevilles, Paris, Delormel, 1758, in-8°. Music by Paul-César Gibert.

References

Sources

External links 
 His plays and their presentations on CÉSAR
 Harny de Guerville on Data.bnf.fr

18th-century French dramatists and playwrights
French opera librettists
Year of birth missing
Year of death missing